Kantaranguri is a census town in the Kashipur CD block in the Raghunathpur subdivision of the Purulia district in the state of West Bengal, India.

Geography

Location

Area overview
Purulia district forms the lowest step of the Chota Nagpur Plateau. The general scenario is undulating land with scattered hills. Raghunathpur subdivision occupies the northern part of the district. 83.80% of the population of the subdivision  lives in rural areas. However, there are pockets of urbanization and 16.20% of the population lives in urban areas. There are 14 census towns in the subdivision. It is presented in the map given alongside. There is a coal mining area around Parbelia and two thermal power plants are there – the 500 MW Santaldih Thermal Power Station and the 1200 MW Raghunathpur Thermal Power Station. The subdivision has a rich heritage of old temples, some of them belonging to the 11th century or earlier. The Banda Deul is a monument of national importance. The comparatively more recent in historical terms, Panchkot Raj has interesting and intriguing remains in the area.

Note: The map alongside presents some of the notable locations in the subdivision. All places marked in the map are linked in the larger full screen map.

Demographics
According to the 2011 Census of India, Kantaranguri had a total population of 5,435, of which 2,736 (50%) were males and 2,699 (50%) were females. There were 472 persons in the age range of 0–6 years. The total number of literate persons in Kantaranguri was 4,445 (89.56% of the population over 6 years).

Infrastructure
According to the District Census Handbook 2011, Puruliya, Kantaranguri covered an area of 1.6228 km2. Among the civic amenities, the protected water supply involved tap water from treated sources. It had 1,081 domestic electric connections. Among the medical facilities it had a dispensary/ health centre 1 km away, a nursing home 6 km away, 25 medicine shops. Among the educational facilities it had were 2 primary schools, 1 middle school, the nearest secondary school, the nearest senior secondary school, at Raniganj 0.5 km away, the nearest degree college at Kashipur 8 km away.

Education
Beko Anchal High School is a Bengali-medium coeducational institution established in 1967. It has facilities for teaching from class V to class XII.

Vidyasagar Vidyapith is a Bengali-medium coeducational institution established in 1996. It has facilities for teaching from class V to class X.

Healthcare
There is a primary health centre at Kantaranguri (PO Beko), with 6 beds.

References

Cities and towns in Purulia district